Highland Center, Indiana
Hollywood and Highland Center
Highland Center serving the High Huts of the White Mountains